Leodis V. McDaniel High School, formerly James Madison High School, is one of nine comprehensive public high schools in the Portland Public Schools in the city of Portland, Oregon, United States. The school serves neighborhood students and many transfer students in grades 9–12.

History
The high school was founded in 1957, and was originally named after Founding Father James Madison, the fourth US President and co-author of the Constitution. Construction on the campus began in 1955. Leodis V. McDaniel became the principal of the school in 1983, and remained until his death in 1987. On June 29, 2004, the school was damaged by fire, probably caused by fireworks.

Two movies have been filmed at the school: Paranoid Park (2007) and Twilight (2008). The school was renovated in 2019-2021 as part of a $790 million bond measured passed in 2017. Classes took place at the former John Marshall High School in Portland's Lents neighborhood during the renovation. During the renovations, the school board began a process to re-name the school, as Madison had been a slaveholder. On February 24, 2021, Portland Public School Board voted to rename Madison High School after Leodis V. McDaniel, a former principal of the school who was well respected in the community. In April 2021, the school mascot was changed from the Senators to the Mountain Lions.

Curriculum
McDaniel High School offers a full range of college preparatory core content classes as well as unique elective options in the areas of mathematics, performing & visual arts, science, social science, and world languages. Students may challenge themselves by enrolling in Advanced Placement and dual credit courses. The latter are taught by McDaniel faculty who work in partnership with Portland Community College.

Athletics
McDaniel participates in the Portland Interscholastic League at the 6A level.  Team sports include soccer, cross country, football, basketball, baseball, volleyball, swimming, dance team, wrestling and track and field.  McDaniel athletics is most known for its baseball program, which holds the most state titles of any high school baseball program in the state of Oregon.

Students
In the 2016–2017 school year, McDaniel's student population was 33.3% White, 24.5% Hispanic, 16.3% African American, 13.6% Asian, 2.0% Pacific Islander, 0.8% Native American, and 9.5% mixed race, making it one of Oregon's most diverse high schools.

Notable alumni

 Leslie A. Baxter, educator
 Craig Berkman, politician 
 Kent Bottenfield, Major League Baseball player
 Brian Cole (bass guitarist), member of The Association
 Paul J. De Muniz, first Hispanic Chief Justice of the Oregon Supreme Court
 Rob Dressler, Major League Baseball player
 Terry Ley, Major League Baseball pitcher
 John Minnis, politician
 Jim Pepper, musician
 Billy Rancher, musician
 Rick Wise, first Major League Baseball pitcher to pitch a no-hitter and hit a home run in the same game

References

High schools in Portland, Oregon
Educational institutions established in 1957
Public high schools in Oregon
1957 establishments in Oregon
Portland Public Schools (Oregon)
Madison South, Portland, Oregon
James Madison